Stanton St. Quintin Quarry & Motorway Cutting is a 2.2 hectare geological Site of Special Scientific Interest southeast of Stanton St Quintin in Wiltshire, England, notified in 1971.

Sources

 English Nature citation sheet for the site (accessed 23 July 2006)

External links
 English Nature website (SSSI information)

Sites of Special Scientific Interest in Wiltshire
Sites of Special Scientific Interest notified in 1971
Quarries in Wiltshire
Road cuttings in the United Kingdom